Idioiblidae is a family of normal barnacles in the order Iblomorpha. There are at least three genera and about five described species in Idioiblidae.

Genera
These genera belong to the family Idioiblidae:
 Chaetolepas Studer, 1889
 Chitinolepas Buckeridge & Newman, 2006
 Idioibla Buckeridge & Newman, 2006

References

Further reading

 

Barnacles